The Toronto Transit Commission version of the Peter Witt streetcar was designed by the Cleveland Street Railway in the United States and built under license by Canada Car and Foundry of Montreal. A small number were also built by the Ottawa Car Company and the Preston Car Company. Between 1921 and 1923, 575 of these streetcars were ordered by the TTC for use on Toronto streets.

In early 1928, the TTC modified Peter Witt cars 2500–2522 for radial service on the Lake Simcoe line (former Metropolitan line of the Toronto and York Radial Railway). These cars were fitted with air whistles, large-flange wheels, and flag and marker light brackets. They were mainly used to handle heavy crowds from Glen Echo to Bond Lake. However, on one occasion some of these Peter Witt cars went all the way to Sutton to accommodate an Orangemen's picnic.

The Peter Witts ran on the busiest streetcar routes, and were heavily used until they were replaced by the Yonge and University subway lines. Those still in use were officially retired in 1965.

Although most of the cars were scrapped, number 2766 was retained for historic purposes, and in 2001 the Toronto Transit Commission budgeted $100,000 to have it restored to its original condition. The TTC currently uses it for charters and other related events. It is frequently taken out during events such as Doors Open Toronto.

The shell of car 2500 was found abandoned at Haliburton Scout Reserve. Car 2890 is preserved in operating condition at the Seashore Trolley Museum.

Classes
The following Peter Witt classes were used in Toronto:

References

Toronto streetcar vehicles